W. Carl Kester is an American economist currently the George Fisher Baker, Jr. Professor of Business Administration at Harvard Business School.

References

Year of birth missing (living people)
Living people
Harvard Business School faculty
American economists
Harvard Business School alumni